Paul Zumthor,  (5 August 1915 – 11 January 1995) was a medievalist, literary historian, and linguist. He was a Swiss from Geneva.

Biography
He studied in Paris with Gustave Cohen and worked on French etymology with Walther von Wartburg. In studying medieval French poetry, he formulated the concept of mouvance (variability). He also emphasised "vocality" in medieval poetry, the place of the human voice.
 
He held two major professorial positions at the University of Amsterdam from 1952 and at the Université de Montréal from 1971 to 1980, when he later became emeritus. In 1992, he was made a Knight of the National Order of Quebec.

Zumthor was elected a member of the Royal Netherlands Academy of Arts and Sciences in 1969, this was changed into a foreign membership in 1971.

Legacy
Within J. M. Coetzee's novel Elizabeth Costello, Zumthor is quoted at length by a character Emmanuel Egudu. Coetzee describes Zumthor as "a man from the snowy wastes of Canada, the great scholar of orality Paul Zumthor."

Works
Merlin le prophète. Un thème de la littérature polémique, de l'historiographie et des romans (1943)
Antigone ou l'espérance. (1945)
Victor Hugo poète de Satan (1946)
Saint Bernard de Clairvaux (1947) with Albert Béguin
Positions actuelles de la linguistique et de l'histoire littéraire (1948)
Lettres de Héloïse et Abélard (1950)
Abréviations composées (1951)
L'Inventio dans la poésie française archaïque (1952)
Miroirs de l'Amour. Tragédie et Préciosité (1952)
Histoire littéraire de la France médiévale (VIe-XIVe siècles). (1954)
Charles le Chauve (1957)
La griffe, Paris (1957)
Précis de syntaxe du francais contemporain (1958) with Walther von Wartburg
La Vie quotidienne en Hollande au temps De Rembrandt (1960) as Daily Life in Rembrandt's Holland (1962) translated by Simon Watson Taylor
Les Contrebandiers (1962)
Langue et techniques poétiques à l'époque romane (XIe - XIIIe siècles) (1963)
Un prêtre montheysan et le sac de Liège en 1468. 'La Complainte de la Cité de Liège', poème inédit. (1963) editor with Willem Nooman
Guillaume le Conquérant et la civilisation de son temps (1964)
Roman et Gothique: deux aspects de la poésie médiévale (1966)
Essai de poétique médiévale (1972)
Langue, texte, énigme (1975)
Anthologie des grands rhétoriqueurs (1978)
La Masque et la lumière (1978)
Parler du Moyen âge (1980) translated as Speaking of the Middle Ages (1986) by Sarah White
Introduction à la poésie orale (1983) as Oral Poetry: An Introduction (1990) by Kathryn Murphy-Judy
La Poésie et la Voix dans la civilisation médiévale (1984)
Jeux de mémoire: aspects de la mnémotechnie médiévale (1986) with Bruno Roy
Midi le Juste (1986) poems
La Fête des fous (1987) novel
La Lettre et la Voix (1987)
Point de fuite (1989)
Écriture et nomadisme: entretiens et essais (1990)
La Traversée (1991)
La mesure du monde (1993)
La Porte à côté (1994)
Fin en Soi (1996) poems
Babel ou l'inachèvement (1997)

References

Further reading
Christopher Lucken (1998), Paul Zumthor, ou l'invention permanente: critique, histoire, poésie. At Google Books.

External links
  (French language)
  (French language)

1915 births
1995 deaths
Knights of the National Order of Quebec
20th-century Swiss historians
Swiss male writers
Swiss medievalists
Swiss emigrants to Canada
Academic staff of the Université de Montréal
20th-century male writers
Writers from Geneva
Members of the Royal Netherlands Academy of Arts and Sciences